William Roper ( – 4 January 1578) was an English lawyer and member of Parliament. The son of a Kentish gentleman, he married Margaret, daughter of Sir Thomas More. He wrote a highly regarded biography of his father-in-law.

Life
William Roper the second was the eldest son of John Roper (d. 1524), Attorney-General to Henry VIII, and his wife Jane (died c.1544), daughter and coheir of Sir John Fyneux, Chief Justice of King's Bench. The Ropers were an ancient Kentish family, owners of the manor of St Dunstan outside the West Gate of Canterbury, since known as the Roper Gate. He was educated at one of the English universities and the studied law at Lincoln's Inn, being called to the bar in 1525. He was appointed Clerk of the Pleas in the Court of King's Bench, a post previously held by his father, holding the post until shortly before his death. Aged about twenty-three it is thought he joined the household of Sir Thomas More, marrying Margaret, More's eldest daughter, in 1521. They lived together in Well Hall in Eltham, Kent.

Erasmus, who knew More and his family well, described Roper as a young man "who is wealthy, of excellent and modest character and not unacquainted with literature". Roper became a convert to the Lutheran doctrine of Justification by Faith and spoke so freely of his belief that he was summoned to appear before Cardinal Wolsey on an accusation of heresy. More often disputed with Roper over his belief. He said to his daughter,  To these prayers by More, Roper attributed his return to Catholicism.

Roper and his wife took in Margaret Throckmorton. She would become the prioress of St Monica in Leuven.

He was a member of various Parliaments (as MP for several constituencies including Rochester and Canterbury) between 1529 and 1558 and appointed High Sheriff of Kent for 1554–55. Although he remained a Roman Catholic, he was permitted to retain his office of prothonotary of the Court of King's Bench after the accession of Elizabeth I. However, his diatribe against Elizabeth's late mother, Anne Boleyn, in his biography of More earned him the enmity of many Elizabethan loyalists and Protestants.

His biography of Sir Thomas More was written during the reign of Mary I nearly twenty years after More's death, but was not printed until 1626, when it became a primary source for More's earliest biographers because of Roper's intimate knowledge of his father-in-law.

In popular culture
Roper is an important character in Robert Bolt's play A Man for All Seasons, portrayed as a contrarian, somewhat thick-headed man who always opposes whatever doctrine is the established one. After arguing theology with Roper, More says, "They're a cantankerous lot, the Ropers, always swimming against the stream. Old Roper was the same."

In the 1966 film adaptation Roper was portrayed by Corin Redgrave.

References

External links

Full text of Roper's The Life of Sir Thomas More

1496 births
1578 deaths
15th-century English people
16th-century biographers
16th-century English MPs
16th-century English writers
16th-century male writers
16th-century Roman Catholics
English biographers
English Lutherans
English Roman Catholics
High Sheriffs of Kent
More family
Prothonotaries